The 2022 Indonesia President's Cup Finals was the two-legged final that decided the winner of the 2022 Indonesia President's Cup, the fifth season of Indonesia's pre-season premier club football tournament organised by PSSI.

It was a two-legged match home-and-away format.

The finals was contested between Arema and Borneo Samarinda. The first leg was hosted by Arema at Kanjuruhan in Malang on 14 July, while the second leg was hosted by Borneo Samarinda at Segiri in Samarinda three days later. Two teams were met at finals on 2017 edition when Arema won the cup.

Arema won the finals 1–0 on aggregate for their third overall and second consecutive title.

Teams

Venues

Road to the final

Note: In all results below, the score of the finalist is given first (H: home; A: away).

Format
The final was played on a home-and-away two-legged basis. The away goals rule would not be applied, and extra time would be played if the aggregate score was tied after the second leg. If the aggregate score was still tied after extra time, a penalty shoot-out would be used to determine the winner.

Matches
All times were local, WIB (UTC+7).

First leg

Second leg

Notes

References 

Piala Presiden Finals
Piala Presiden Finals
July 2022 sports events in Indonesia